The Twin Peaks are two prominent hills with an elevation of about  located near the geographic center of San Francisco, California. Only  Mount Davidson is higher within the city.

Location and climate
The peaks form a divide for the summer coastal fog pushed in from the Pacific Ocean. Their west-facing slopes often get fog and strong winds, while the east-facing slopes receive more sun and warmth. Thin, sandy soil is commonplace on Twin Peaks, making them susceptible to erosion. On some rare occasions, Twin Peaks has been able to get a dusting of snow especially on February 5, 1976, when it got several inches of snow. Most recently on February 26, 2011, and February 5, 2019, Twin Peaks got a few flurries of snowflakes.

History

Early history 
Before the arrival of the Europeans, the native Ohlone people may have used Twin Peaks as a lookout or hunting ground.

18th and 19th centuries 
When the Spanish conquistadors and settlers arrived at the beginning of the 18th century, they called the area "Los Pechos de la Chola" or "Breasts of the Indian Maiden" and devoted the area to ranching.  When San Francisco passed under American control during the 19th century, it was renamed "Twin Peaks".

21st century 
In 2016 the SFMTA introduced a traffic calming pilot to reduce the amount of space allocated to cars and make the summit area more inviting to a wider range of travel modes. The "figure of 8" roadway around the two peaks was reduced to a two-way road on the western side of the peaks, with the east side designated for pedestrians and bikes only.

Attractions

To the north is one of the city's many reservoirs. It is owned by the San Francisco Fire Department, and supplies water to the Fire Department's independent HPFS water system for fighting fires, established after the 1906 earthquake and fire.

The top of Twin Peaks is undeveloped. It is part of the  Twin Peaks Natural Area, managed and owned by the San Francisco Recreation and Parks Department. These preserved areas are home to many natural resources and wildlife. As part of the Mission blue butterfly habitat conservation, Twin Peaks is one of the few remaining habitats for this endangered species. Many bird species, insects and vegetation thrive in these areas.

The Muni Metro Twin Peaks Tunnel runs beneath Twin Peaks, linking downtown San Francisco with West Portal and the southwestern part of the city. There is no public transportation all the way to the top of the Peaks, but the 37 Corbett Muni line stops on Crestline Drive near a path up the hill.

The San Francisco Police Department Academy is at the base of the peaks.

The name "Twin Peaks" is also applied to the surrounding neighborhood.

Education

The San Francisco Unified School District operates the Ruth Asawa San Francisco School of the Arts in the Twin Peaks neighborhood.  The closest SFUSD school to the top of Twin Peaks is Rooftop

See also

 49-Mile Scenic Drive
 List of hills in San Francisco
Twin Peaks Tunnel

References

External links

 

Hills of San Francisco
Landmarks in San Francisco
Mountains of the San Francisco Bay Area
Neighborhoods in San Francisco